Genaro (from the Latin Januarius, meaning "devoted to Janus") is a Hispanic masculine given name that may refer to the following notable people:
Genaro Borrego Estrada (born 1949), Mexican politician
Genaro Carrió (1922–1997), Argentinian jurist and translator
Genaro Castillo (born 1993), Mexican football player
Genaro Carreño Muro (born 1958), Mexican politician
Genaro David Góngora (born 1937), Mexican jurist
Genaro Díaz (1904–1963), Mexican bobsledder
Genaro Estrada (1887–1937), Mexican statesman, academic, and writer
Genaro Fessia (born 1981), Argentine rugby union footballer
Genaro García (1977–2013), Mexican boxer
Genaro García Luna (born 1968), Mexican government official and engineer
Genaro Hernández (1966–2011), American boxer 
Genaro Léon (born 1960), Mexican boxer
Genaro Lezcano, Argentine basketball player
Genaro López (born 1954), Panamanian union leader and politician
Genaro Magsaysay (1924–1978), Filipino politician and lawyer
Genaro Mejía de la Merced (born 1968), Mexican politician
Genaro Prono (born 1989), Paraguayan swimmer
Genaro Rodríguez (born 1998), Spanish football player
Genaro Rojas (born 1970), Mexican sprinter
Genaro Saavedra (born 1895), Filipino track and field athlete
Genaro Sermeño (born 1948), Salvadorian football player
Genaro Snijders (born 1989), Dutch football winger
Genaro Ruiz Arriaga (born 1955), Mexican politician 
Genaro Ruiz Camacho (1954–1998), American organized crime leader
Genaro V. Vásquez (1892–1967), Mexican lawyer
Genaro Vázquez Rojas (1930–1972), Mexican school teacher and guerrilla fighter

See also
Gennaro (disambiguation)

Spanish masculine given names